The Falcon in Danger is a 1943 American mystery film directed by William Clemens and starring Tom Conway, Jean Brooks, Amelita Ward and Elaine Shepard. The film was the sixth of thirteen  The Falcon detective films produced by RKO, all starring Conway.

Plot
At a New York airport, a passenger aircraft coming in from Washington D.C., crash-lands at a crowded airport, however nobody is on board the plane. The aircraft had been hijacked at its previous stop with all but the pilot and two leading industrialists left behind.  In addition to the three men, $100,000 worth of securities is also missing.

Although he promised his "fiancée" from Texas, Bonnie Caldwell (Amelita Ward), that he will give up solving crime, Tom Lawrence (Tom Conway), aka The Falcon, can't resist the lure of a fresh mystery. When she receives a ransom note, Nancy Palmer (Elaine Shepard) asks for his help in locating her father (Clarence Kolb), one of the missing industrialists. One of the Falcon's prime suspects is Nancy's jealous cousin Iris (Jean Brooks).

Police Inspector Timothy Donovan (Cliff Clark) and his assistant, Bates (Edward Gargan), are called to investigate the mystery. Later, all the passengers, except for Nancy's father, Stanley Harris Palmer, and his assistant, Wally Fairchild (Robert Emmett Keane), are found stranded at a rest stop. Nancy is told to leave $25,000 at a drinking fountain on Park Road, while Iris tells Tom that she suspects Nancy's fiancé, Ken Gibson (Richard Davies), told the kidnappers that Fairchild was carrying $100,000 in securities.

Tom accompanies Iris and Nancy to the Palmer's house and later sees Nancy leave a box by the drinking fountain. When two men collect the box, Tom follows their car on horseback and finds it belongs to an antique store owned by George Morley (Richard Martin). Donovan announces that Palmer has returned home alive; he and Fairchild stayed on the aircraft but strangers robbed Palmer at gunpoint, ordered him to parachute from the aircraft while the pilot set the controls on autopilot. More clues to the mystery appear, Tom finds a piece of junk that appears to be part of the aircraft and the missing securities which he turns over to Donovan.

Donovan suspects Fairchild but state troopers report the missing pilot and Fairchild have been found dead in a field. Morley becomes the next likely culprit but disappears.  As he unravels the mystery, Tom reconstructs the second part of the flight. With other passengers gone, Palmer killed Fairchild who had proof of Palmer's cheating the government, then after take off, had also killed the pilot and dumped the bodies.

Palmer's dog attacks Morley in the antique store. Just then, Donovan arrives in time to see Tom shoot and kill Palmer in self-defense. Later at the airport, Bonnie tells Tom she is going home to Texas by herself. Dejected, Tom declares that he is forsaking all women, until a pretty co-ed approaches him, asking for his help.

Cast

 Tom Conway as Tom Lawrence / The Falcon  
 Jean Brooks as Iris Fairchild  
 Elaine Shepard as Nancy Palmer  
 Amelita Ward as Bonnie Caldwell  
 Cliff Clark as Insp. Timothy Donovan  
 Edward Gargan as Det. Bates 
 Clarence Kolb as Stanley Harris Palmer  
 Felix Basch as Morley  
 Richard Davies as Kenneth Gibson  
 Richard Martin as George Morley  
 Erford Gage as Evan Morley 
 Eddie Dunn as Det. Grimes
 Ian Wolfe as Thomas
 Art Dupuis as Air raid warden
 George De Normand as Policeman
 Bob Thom as Excited man
 Harry Semels as Excited man
 Sid Troy as Excited man
 Elmer Jerome as Eric
 Rosemary LaPlanche as Nurse (credited as Rosemary La Planche)
 Robert Emmett Keane as Wally Fairchild (credited as Robert E. Keane)
 Lew Kelly as Guard
 Lynton Brent as Guard
 Eddie Borden as Welder
 Hooper Atchley as Dr. Oliver
 Bruce Edwards as Mechanic
 Robert Andersen as Airport attendant
 Joan Barclay as Hysterical girl
 Selmer Jackson as Airline official
 Charles Trowbridge as Palmer's doctor

Production
Principal photography on The Falcon in Danger took place from April 13 to early-May 1943. According to a Hollywood Reporter news item, the growing popularity of the Falcon series led to rushing the film into production. The previous film in the series, The Falcon Strikes Back was filmed from January 19 to early-February 1943.

To conserve costs, the main entrance and several buildings on the studio lot were camouflaged to look like an airport. The aircraft depicted were a miniature Lockheed Model 10 Electra and stock footage of a Douglas DC-3 in flight, and the Capelis XC-12, a failed 1933 twin-engine transport aircraft that found new life at RKO as a non-flying movie prop.

Reception
Film historians Richard Jewell and Vernon Harbin described The Falcon in Danger as an attempt to "upgrade the romantic appeal of the Falcon series". Further, "Screenwriters Fed Niblo Jr. and Craig Rice did a fairly smooth job of working the beauties into their story, an otherwise standard whodunit  involving a double murder and  the theft of $100,000 in securities.

References

Notes

Bibliography

 Drew, Bernard A. Motion Picture Series and Sequels: A Reference Guide. London: Routledge, 2013. .
 Jewell, Richard and Vernon Harbin. The RKO Story. New Rochelle, New York: Arlington House, 1982. .
 Orriss, Bruce. When Hollywood Ruled the Skies: The Aviation Film Classics of World War II. Hawthorne, California: Aero Associates Inc., 1984. .

External links
 
 
 
 

1943 films
American mystery films
American black-and-white films
1943 mystery films
Films scored by Roy Webb
Films directed by William Clemens
RKO Pictures films
The Falcon (film character) films
1940s English-language films
1940s American films